Peter Joseph Niesewand (30 June 1944 – 4 February 1983), journalist and novelist, was born in South Africa but grew up in Rhodesia where he ran a news bureau, filing for the BBC, United Press, AFP, and many newspapers, notably the Guardian. On 20 February 1973 he was arrested and spent 73 days in solitary confinement for his criticism of conditions under Ian Smith's government and his coverage of the guerrilla war. His sentence of two years hard labour for revealing official secrets was commuted on appeal after an international outcry. He was deported on release from prison, and left with his wife of three years, Nonie, and young son Oliver. He emigrated to the United Kingdom to complete his only non-fiction book, "In Camera: Secret Justice in Rhodesia", and was named 1973 International Journalist of the Year, an award he won again in 1976 for his coverage of the Lebanese civil war, again for the Guardian. As their Asia correspondent he also covered the 1979 Soviet invasion of Afghanistan from on the ground, experiences that inform his last novel, Scimitar. He subsequently returned to London to become their deputy news editor until his untimely death of a heart attack at the age of 38.

Niesewand is credited by Colin Smith in Carlos - Portrait of a Terrorist for originating terrorist Ilich Ramírez Sánchez's 'Jackal' alias:

Works

Besides journalism and non-fiction Niesewand also wrote five novels: 

 and

Notes and references

External links
BBC TV report by Peter Niesewand on Rhodesia being declared a republic, 2 March 1970

1944 births
1983 deaths
South African emigrants to Rhodesia
Zimbabwean exiles
Zimbabwean journalists
People imprisoned on charges of terrorism
Prisoners and detainees of Rhodesia
20th-century Zimbabwean writers
Rhodesian emigrants to the United Kingdom
Rhodesian journalists
White South African people
Naturalised citizens of Rhodesia
White Rhodesian people
Rhodesian writers
20th-century journalists